Rodney Carl Carter (born October 30, 1964) is a former professional American football running back in the National Football League (NFL). He played three seasons for the Pittsburgh Steelers (1987–1989).

Rodney Carter attended Elizabeth High School in Elizabeth and graduated from Purdue University.

References

1964 births
Living people
Elizabeth High School (New Jersey) alumni
Sportspeople from Elizabeth, New Jersey
Players of American football from New Jersey
American football running backs
Purdue Boilermakers football players
Pittsburgh Steelers players
Purdue Boilermakers baseball players